Rune Bjerke (born 17 June 1960) is a Norwegian businessperson and politician for the Labour Party.

Rune is son of Juul Bjerke and brother of Siri Bjerke. Bjerke studied economics at the University of Oslo, and has a master's degree in public administration from Harvard University.

From 1992 to 1995 he was city commissioner (byråd) of finance in the city cabinet of Oslo. He has previously been advisor in the Norwegian Ministry of Petroleum and Energy, director in Scancem International and chief executive officer in Hafslund. From 2007 to 2019 he was chief executive officer of DNB.

He is the chairman of the board of Doorstep, and of both the Norwegian Financial Services Association and Finance Norway.

Bjerke is married to the Labour party politician Libe Rieber-Mohn.

References
Businessweek executive profile 
Norwegian Broadcasting Corporation online 
Financial Times 

1960 births
Living people
University of Oslo alumni
Harvard Kennedy School alumni
Labour Party (Norway) politicians
Politicians from Oslo
Norwegian chief executives
Norwegian bankers
DNB ASA people
Norwegian expatriates in the United States